Poast Town is an unincorporated community located in northeastern Madison Township, Butler County, Ohio, United States, on State Route 4, about one mile north of Middletown in Section 12 of T2R4 of the Congress Lands.  It was laid out in 1818 by Peter Post as the town of West Liberty.  A post office with the name Poast Town was established in 1848 but closed in 1934. Mail is provided through the Middletown post office, it is located in the Middletown telephone exchange.  It is in the Madison Local School District.

References

Further reading
Bert S. Barlow, W.H. Todhunter, Stephen D. Cone, Joseph J. Pater, and Frederick Schneider, eds.  Centennial History of Butler County, Ohio.  Hamilton, Ohio:  B.F. Bowen, 1905.
Butler County Engineer's Office.  Butler County Official Transportation Map, 2003.  Fairfield Township, Butler County, Ohio:  The Office, 2003.
A History and Biographical Cyclopaedia of Butler County, Ohio with Illustrations and Sketches of Its Representative Men and Pioneers.  Cincinnati, Ohio:  Western Biographical Publishing Company, 1882. 

Populated places established in 1818
Unincorporated communities in Butler County, Ohio
1818 establishments in Ohio
Unincorporated communities in Ohio